Matt Llano (born August 1, 1988) is an American long distance runner who competes in half marathon and marathon events. He represented his country at the 2014 IAAF World Half Marathon Championships.

Running career

High school
Matt Llano was a fourth-place finisher at 2005 Maryland 4A State Cross Country Championship and an eighth place finisher at the 2004 Maryland 4A State Cross Country Championship representing Broadneck High School. He finished behind high school teammate Matthew Centrowitz Jr. as a Junior and Senior to lead their team to Maryland Public Secondary Schools Athletic Association state team titles. By the time he graduated from Broadneck, he had been named in the All-County selection on two occasions.

Collegiate
Matt Llano was an All-American in cross country for the Richmond Spiders in 2010. Matt earned 10k All-American status on the track. Matt finished third at the 2007 USA Junior outdoor national championships at IU Michael A. Carroll Track & Soccer Stadium IUPUI in Indianapolis, Indiana in the 10,000 meters with a time of 31:19.03 to earn USATF Jr. All-America honors.

Professional
In January 2014, Matt Llano ran 61:47 in Houston  at the USA Half Marathon Championships to earn 5th place. At the 2014 IAAF World Half Marathon Championships on March 29, 2014 races were held in Copenhagen, Denmark, Matt Llano finished 35th. On 22 October 2015, Matt Llano ran the 2015 Berlin Marathon in a time of 2:12:28.

Career statistics

Track and field

Road Racing

Personal best
10,000 meters: 28:43.30
Half marathon: 1:01:47  17th fastest American half marathon all-time
Marathon: 2:12:28

References

External links
 
 
 
 Matt Llano profile at Athlete Biz 
 Matt Llano Athletic profile 
 Matt Llano profile  at University of Richmond
  Matt Llano video journal training for 2014 Bank of America Chicago Marathon and life story

Living people
1988 births
People from Annapolis, Maryland
Sportspeople from Maryland
Sportspeople from Virginia
Sportspeople from Arizona
American male middle-distance runners
American male long-distance runners
Gay sportsmen
University of Richmond alumni
American LGBT sportspeople
LGBT track and field athletes